Admiral Sir Henry Ruthven Moore  (29 August 1886 – 12 March 1978) was the last British admiral to command the Home Fleet during World War II. He served in that post from 1944 to 1945.

Naval career
Educated at Sherborne, Moore joined the Royal Navy in 1902. He served in World War I taking part in the Battle of Jutland in 1916.

After the war Moore joined the staff of the Royal Naval College, Greenwich and then became Naval Assistant Secretary to the Committee of Imperial Defence. He was appointed Deputy Director of Plans in 1930 and then took command of the cruiser  in 1933. He went on to be Chief of Staff for the Home Fleet in 1936 and Chief of Staff to the Commander-in-Chief, Portsmouth in 1938.

He served in World War II initially as Commander of 3rd Cruiser Squadron and then as Assistant Chief of the Naval Staff from 1940. He became Vice Chief of the Naval Staff in 1941, Commander of the 2nd Battle Squadron in June 1943 and Commander-in-Chief of the Home Fleet in 1944.

After the War he was appointed Head of the British Naval Mission in Washington D. C. and then became the first Chairman of the Military Staff Committee of the United Nations Security Council in 1946. His final appointment was as Commander-in-Chief, The Nore in 1948. He retired in 1951.

References

|-

|-

|-

1886 births
1978 deaths
Commanders of the Royal Victorian Order
Companions of the Distinguished Service Order
Foreign recipients of the Legion of Merit
Knights Grand Cross of the Order of the Bath
Lords of the Admiralty
People from Plumstead
People educated at Sherborne School
Royal Navy admirals of World War II
Royal Navy officers of World War I
Admiralty personnel of World War II
People from Wateringbury
Military personnel from Kent